Mauricio Monteserín (born 23 March 1976) is a Spanish rower. He competed in the men's double sculls event at the 2000 Summer Olympics.

References

1976 births
Living people
Spanish male rowers
Olympic rowers of Spain
Rowers at the 2000 Summer Olympics
Sportspeople from Oviedo